The 1987–88 SMU Mustangs men's basketball team represented Southern Methodist University during the 1987–88 men's college basketball season. There, they defeated Notre Dame to advance to the Second Round. In the Second Round, they lost to the #2 seed Duke, 94–79.

Schedule

|-
!colspan=9 style=| Non-Conference Regular Season

|-
!colspan=9 style=| SWC Regular Season

|-
!colspan=9 style=| SWC tournament

|-
!colspan=9 style=| 1988 NCAA tournament

References 

SMU Mustangs men's basketball seasons
SMU
SMU
SMU
SMU